Acharya Nagarjuna University (IAST: Ācārya Nāgārjuna Vișvavidyālaya)  is a state university in Namburu, Guntur district, Andhra Pradesh, India.

History 
The university was established as Nagarjuna University by Act 43 of 1976 of A.P. State Legislature and Governed by Act 4 of 1991 covering 6 Universities of the State. It was inaugurated on 11 September 1976 by then President of India, Sri Fakruddin Ali Ahmed. It was renamed Acharya Nagarjuna University through the A.P. Universities (Amendment) Ordinance, 2004, promulgated by the Governor of Andhra Pradesh. In 1976, Andhra University started a Post-Graduate Centre in Maddi Bala Triupura Sundaramma  Polytechnic, Nallapadu, Guntur District of Andhra Pradesh, as an Extension Center to cater to the needs of higher education of the people of this region.

Organisation and administration

Vice chancellors
The university's past vice chancellors:
 V. Balaiah (19-8-1976 to 19-8-1979)
 B. Sarveswara Rao (20-8-1979 to 08-02-1981)
 B. Swami (09-02-1981 to 09-8-1981)
 D. Bhaskara Reddy (10-8-1981 to 30-11-1982)
 K. Raja Ram Mohana Rao (30-11-1982 to 30-5-1986)
 G. J. V. Jagannadha Raju (30-5-1986 to 15-8-1988)
 D. Ramakotaiah (15-8-1988 to 15-8-1991)
 K. Penchalaiah I/c., (15-8-1991 to 20-12-1991)
 Y. C. Simhadri (20-12-1991 to 23-01-1995)
 S. V. J. Lakshman (23-01-1995 to 16-11-1997)
 P. Ramakanth Reddy I/c., (16-11-1997 to 23-9-1998)
 C. V. Raghavulu (24-9-1998 to 11-10-2001)
 D. Vijayanarayana Reddy (12-10-2001 to 30-11-2001)
 Chandrakanth Kokate FAC (01-12-2001 to 28-4-2002)
 L. Venugopal Reddy (29-4-2002 to 5-5-2005)
 V. Balamohanadas (6-5-2005 to 3-5-2008)
 Y. R. Haragopal Reddy (14-08-2008 to 19-06-2011)
 K. V. Rao (20-06-2011 to 18-04-2015)
 K. R. S. Sambasiva Rao (19-04-2015 to 11-08-2015)
 B. Udaya Lakshmi (12-08-2015 to 03-12-2015)
 V. S. S. Kumar (04-12-2015 to 13-01-2016)
 A. Rajendra Prasad (14-01-2016 to 17-01-2019)
 K. Ramji (18-01-2019 to 04-11-2019)
 Rajasekhar P. (04-11-2019 to present)

University College of Engineering and Technology
A new college for engineering and technology was established at the main campus of the university in 2009. This is one of many engineering colleges in the Guntur region, but it has the distinction of being the first to be managed entirely by the government. AICTE has visited the campus and completed the inspection to award grants and other recognition purposes to assess if it meets the minimum criteria.

Ranking

The College of Pharmaceutical Sciences was ranked 64 by National Institutional Ranking Framework NIRF) pharmacy ranking 2020.

See also
 List of state universities in India

References

External links

1976 establishments in Andhra Pradesh
Universities in Guntur
Educational institutions established in 1976
State universities in Andhra Pradesh